The Bank of America Championship was a golf tournament on the Champions Tour from 1981 to 2008. It was played annually in June at the Nashawtuc Country Club in Concord, Massachusetts, United States. Bank of America was the main sponsor of the tournament.

The tournament was founded in 1981 as the Marlboro Classic. The Marlboro Classic was played at the Marlborough Country Club from 1981 to 1983. The purse for the 2008 tournament was US$1,650,000, with $247,500 for the winner.

Winners
Bank of America Championship
2008 Jeff Sluman
2007 Jay Haas
2006 Cancelled due to rain and flooding 
2005 Mark McNulty
2004 Craig Stadler

FleetBoston Classic
2003 Allen Doyle
2002 Bob Gilder
2001 Larry Nelson
2000 Larry Nelson

BankBoston Classic
1999 Tom McGinnis
1998 Hale Irwin
1997 Hale Irwin

Bank of Boston Senior Classic
1996 Jim Dent
1995 Isao Aoki

Bank of Boston Senior Golf Classic
1994 Jim Albus
1993 Bob Betley

Digital Seniors Classic
1992 Mike Hill
1991 Rocky Thompson
1990 Bob Charles
1989 Bob Charles
1988 Chi-Chi Rodríguez
1987 Chi-Chi Rodríguez
1986 Chi-Chi Rodríguez
1985 Lee Elder

Digital Middlesex Classic
1984 Don January

Marlboro Classic
1983 Don January
1982 Arnold Palmer
1981 Bob Goalby

Source:

References

External links
Official website
PGATOUR.com Tournament website

1981 establishments in Massachusetts
2008 disestablishments in Massachusetts
Former PGA Tour Champions events
Golf in Massachusetts
History of Middlesex County, Massachusetts
Recurring sporting events established in 1981
Recurring sporting events disestablished in 2008
Sports in Middlesex County, Massachusetts
Sports competitions in Massachusetts
Tourist attractions in Concord, Massachusetts